David Castelli (December 30, 1836, Leghorn, Tuscany – 1901, Florence) was an Italian scholar and educator in the field of secular Jewish studies. He was educated at the rabbinical college of Leghorn, and from 1857 to 1863 was teacher of Hebrew and Italian in the Jewish schools of that city. Then he became secretary of the Jewish congregation in Pisa, where at the same time he was a private teacher. From January 1876 until his death he occupied the chair of Hebrew at the Istituto di Studi Superiori Pratici e di Perfezionamento in Florence.

Biography 
David Castelli was born in Livorno, a city which in the 19th century, under the guidance of Rabbi Elia Benamozegh, became the seat of one of the liveliest Italian Jewish communities of the time. Of Castelli's numerous works and essays the following may be mentioned. Initiated by his father to the rabbinical profession, Castelli was self-taught for his higher education until from 1857 to 1863 he was a teacher of Hebrew language and literature in the schools of the city.

 L'Ecclesiaste, Traduzione e Studio Critico, Pisa, 1866
 Leggende Talmudiche, Traduzione con Prefazione Critica, Pisa, 1869
 Il Messia Secondo gli Ebrei Florence, 1874
 Il Diritto di Testare nella Legislazione Ebraica, Florence, 1878
 Della Poesia Biblica, Florence, 1878
 "Il Commento di Sabbatai Donnolo al Libro della Creazione, Testo Ebraico con Note Critiche e Introduzione in Ebraico e in Italiano", Florence, 1880, in Pubblicazioni del Regio Istituto di Studi Superiori
 La Profezia nella Biblia, Florence, 1882
 La Legge del Popolo Ebreo nel suo Storico Svolgimento, Florence, 1884
 Storia degli Israeliti Secondo le Fonti Bibliche Criticamente Esposte, 2 vols., Milan, 1887–88
 Il Cantico dei Cantici, Studio Esegetico, Traduzione e Note, Florence, 1892
 Ammaestramenti del Vecchio e del Nuovo Testamento, Raccolti e Tradotti, Florence, 1896
 Il Poema Semitico del Pessimismo (Il Libro di Job), Tradotto e Commentato, Florence, 1897
 Gli Ebrei, Sunto di Storia Politica e Letteraria, Florence, 1899

References 

  Facchini, C., David Castelli. Ebraismo e scienze delle religioni tra Otto e Novecento, Brescia: Morcelliana, 2005

External links 
 
  Brief biographical information

1836 births
1901 deaths
19th-century Italian educators
19th-century Jewish biblical scholars
Italian biblical scholars
Jewish educators
19th-century Italian Jews
Livornese Jews